St. Clement's Parish is a Roman Catholic parish in Saratoga Springs, New York in the United States under the authority of the Diocese of Albany. Founded under the patronage of Clemens Mary Hofbauer and has been staffed by clergy of the Congregation of the Most Holy Redeemer (the Redemptorists) since its founding in 1917.

History 

In 1916, the parish of St. Peter's, which had been established in 1834 to serve the whole of Saratoga Springs, was split along Broadway. The new parish of St. Clement's was formally opened the following year, when the first Catholic Mass in the parish church was celebrated on opening day, October 14, 1917. Bishop Edmund Gibbons dedicated the church, and thus the parish, to Clement Maria Hofbauer on November 25, 1918. Masses were originally held in the basement of nearby St. Clements School.

The parish serves Catholics on the East Side of the City of Saratoga Springs, as well as in the neighboring Town of Wilton. St. Clement's created the mission church of St. Therese in Gansevoort out of the local Grange hall in 1965; the first Mass was celebrated there on September 18, 1966. After fifty years at its original location, a new building was constructed at its current location and opened in 1967, the 50th anniversary of the parish's foundation.

School 

The Catholic school is first mentioned in parish records in August 1918. The school operated the School Sisters of Notre Dame, who lived in nearby buildings until a convent was constructed in 1931. St. Clement's Regional Catholic School continues to serve Pre-Kindergarten through fifth grade. The current principal is Jane Kromm.

References

External links

St. Clement's Regional Catholic School website

Roman Catholic churches in New York (state)
Roman Catholic parishes of Diocese of Albany
Buildings and structures in Saratoga Springs, New York
Churches in Saratoga County, New York
1917 establishments in New York (state)
Roman Catholic churches completed in 1967
1960s architecture in the United States
20th-century Roman Catholic church buildings in the United States